Srogów may refer to the following places in Poland:

Srogów Dolny
Srogów Górny